The Downtown Booneville Historic District in Booneville, Mississippi is a  historic district which was listed on the National Register of Historic Places in 1998.  It then included 32 contributing buildings and 16 non-contributing ones.

Significant buildings in the district include:
Old Post Office, 100 North Main Street, (Colonial Revival)
Prentiss County Courthouse (c.1925), 101 North Main Street, (Mediterranean Revival)
Masonic Lodge, 104 North Main Street,
101 South Main Street,
106 South Main Street, (Italianate),
Booneville Hardware Store, 112 South Main Street, (Italianate), 
Mobile & Ohio Railroad Depot, 100 West Church Street, (Late 19th Century Railroad Depot),
Warehouse at 101 East Church Street, and
Ashcroft Feeds Store.

The old Post Office includes a mural by artist Stefan Hirsch, completed in 1943 under the Treasury Bureau's Section of Fine Arts
program at the cost of $750 (see accompanying photo #9).

The Prentiss County Courthouse is a three-story Mediterranean Revival-style hipped roof brick building with a five bay arcaded loggia and two two-story flat-roofed wings (see accompanying photo #10).

References

Buildings and structures completed in 1922
Colonial Revival architecture in Mississippi
Italianate architecture in Mississippi
Mission Revival architecture in Mississippi
National Register of Historic Places in Prentiss County, Mississippi
Historic districts on the National Register of Historic Places in Mississippi